The Lordstown Endurance is a full-size battery electric pickup truck with wheel hub motors manufactured by Lordstown Motors in collaboration with Foxconn at its Ohio factory. The Endurance entered production in September 2022. It is the company's first production automobile.

History
Development began as the range-extended electric vehicle Workhorse W-15 in 2016. The automotive press got their first impressions of the W-15 at a May 2017 event held in Long Beach, California. A prototype W-15 was shown in August 2018, fitted with a gasoline range extender sourced from BMW. Steve Burns, the CEO of Workhorse, left that company to help found the automotive startup Lordstown Motors in autumn 2019. The W-15 design was licensed in November 2019 to Lordstown in exchange for a 10% minority stake in the latter company, and Workhorse paused further development of the W-15.

In the second half of December 2019, Lordstown Motors presented the first preliminary information about its vehicle. The electric pickup truck design was renamed to the Lordstown Endurance, adopting an avant-garde design that combines the classic proportions of a semi-truck with lighting that forms a single line with embossing. The W-15 forms the basis of the Endurance, although there are significant differences.

In mid-June 2020, Lordstown presented the first official sketches showing the appearance of the passenger cab of the Endurance, while the world premiere of the pickup took place on June 25 of the same year.

A prototype Endurance caught fire 10 minutes into its first test drive in January 2021 and was completely destroyed. Details of the fire were not released publicly until February 2021; Hindenburg Research, a short-seller of Lordstown stock, published a report in March alleging that Lordstown had inflated preorder numbers to boost investor confidence and provided further details about the fire gleaned from a police report.

In June 2021, company officials said they planned to begin production in fall 2021, even though the company had no firm orders for the truck, as they had sufficient capital to produce into 2022. Also in June, Lordstown CEO Steve Burns and CFO Julio Rodriguez resigned as a result of an investigation into preorders sparked by Hindenburg's report. The company warned that it had experienced difficulty securing sufficient funding to begin full production, and stated that the  it reported in its latest quarterly SEC filing would not be enough to get to "full commercial production." In August of that year, Workhorse divested most of its share in Lordstown.

In September 2021, Lordstown announced the factory would be sold to Foxconn for $280 million to raise the capital needed to start production; Lordstown would enter a contract with Foxconn to manufacture the Endurance. The first vehicles were unveiled in an October 2021 event held jointly by Foxconn and Lordstown. The factory sale to Foxconn closed in May 2022.

Production
Production of the Endurance is planned to take place at the former General Motors Lordstown Assembly factory, which are in the village of the same name in the U.S. state of Ohio, and formerly were owned by Lordstown Motors until they were sold to Foxconn in 2021.

Originally, production was to start in 2020, but due to the COVID-19 pandemic in Ohio, it was postponed to 2021, and in June 2021, this was pushed back to fall 2021 following revelations about a lack of confirmed orders. Production was delayed again in October 2021 to April 2022 after Lordstown announced it was selling the factory to Foxconn. A month later, Lordstown announced that production would be delayed to the third quarter of 2022 due to supply chain issues. Commercial production began on September 29, 2022; Lordstown expects to produce 50 Endurance vehicles in 2022 and up to 450 more in the first half of 2023.

Design

Workhorse W-15
These motors drew from a battery carried between the frame rails consisting of 6,000 cells from Panasonic; gross capacity was 60 kW-hr, but the useable capacity was limited to 40 kW-hr for longevity. The all-electric range was estimated to be .

The body of the W-15 was made of carbon fiber-reinforced composite materials and was based on the design of the Chevrolet Silverado. Larger W-25 and W-35 models were planned.

Powertrain
While the W-15 was a range extended electric pickup, the Endurance eschews the range extender and is a plug-in electric vehicle only that uses four individual wheel hub motors. The estimated range was  using a high-voltage storage battery of unknown capacity.

The hub motors are licensed from Elaphe Propulsion Technologies, a company based in Slovenia. The final weight of the hub motors used on the production Endurance is  each.

Chassis
At the rear, the Endurance uses a beam axle on leaf springs.

Performance

See also 
 Chevrolet Silverado EV
 Ford F-150 Lightning
 GMC Hummer EV
 Rivian R1T
 Tesla Cybertruck

References

Electric trucks
Pickup trucks
Cars introduced in 2020
First car made by manufacturer